The Song is a 2014 American romantic drama film written and directed by Richard Ramsey. The film follows about a singer-songwriter, whose marriage suffers when the song he wrote for his wife propels him to stardom. The film was inspired by the Song of Songs and the life of Solomon.

Plot
Jed King is the son of successful country music legend, David King. Jed meets Rose, the daughter of a vineyard owner, and marries her. He writes a song about her that propels him to stardom. Conflict arises when King becomes involved with Shelby Bale, a free-spirited young musician who is on tour with him. King’s career and marriage begin a downward spiral as a result of his choices and the film chronicles his struggles.

Cast
 Alan Powell as Jed King
 Ali Faulkner as Rose
 Caitlin Nicol-Thomas as Shelby
 Danny Vinson as Shep Jordan
 Aaron Benward as David King
 Kenda Benward as Bethany King
 Jude Ramsey as Ray King
 Gary Jenkins as Stan
 Landon Marshall as Eddie

Casting Notes:
 Alan Powell is co-founder of Anthem Lights.
 Aaron (David King) and Kenda Benward (Bethany) are married in real life as well, and parents of Luke Benward.

References

External links
 
 
 
 
Movie Review: The Song

2014 films
2014 romantic drama films
American romantic drama films
Films based on the Hebrew Bible
Films based on poems
Films about singers
2010s English-language films
2010s American films